M. Azizul Haq (Birth: 13 December 1940) is a former Inspector General of Bangladesh Police and a former adviser to the Caretaker Government of Bangladesh. He was in charge of Ministry of Local Government and Rural Development, Ministry of Shipping and Ministry of Civil Aviation and Tourism. Before joining the police service (Police Service of Pakistan ),He was in the State Bank of Pakistan as a research officer, from 1962 to 1965. He was also a member of the National Pay Commission constituted by the Government. After his retirement from government service, he worked as management and financial consultant of Rupali Insurance Company till the middle of 2020. He is an active Rotarian, being a member of Rotary Club of Dhaka Buriganga whose motto is “Service above self to the distressed and downtrodden people in the society.”

References

Living people
Inspectors General of Police (Bangladesh)
Advisors of Caretaker Government of Bangladesh
1940 births
People from Shariatpur District